Daivathinte Vikrithikal is a 1992 Malayalam-language film co-written and directed by Lenin Rajendran based on M. Mukundan's novel of the same name. The film tells the story of Alphonso, a man who chooses to suffer a slow, torturous life in his little village, Mahe, in preference to fortunes and pleasures away from it. Raghuvaran, Srividya, Rajan P. Dev and Malavika play the pivotal roles.

Raghuvaran was considered for the prestigious National Film Award for Best Actor, along with Mithun Chakraborty for Tahader Katha, but Mithun Chakraborty won the award.

Plot
The story begins in 1954, when the French, the colonial rulers were packing off from Mahé, a coastal town in North Malabar, after 230 years, leaving behind remnants of a cultural history. Those, who considered themselves as belonging to Francophone culture, jumped onto the first available vessel to France.

Alphonso ignored the repeated pleas of his wife, Maggi to leave the land, where they no longer "belonged". The new social order became more, suffocating as Alphonso's earnings (as a "magician" of sorts) dwindled. The arrival of their son, Michael, from France revived hopes of a life without poverty, but Michael went back, leaving behind counterfeit gold and plunging the Alphonso family in deeper debts. Daughter Elsie's affair with Sasi became a local scandal.

Alphonso decided to leave, but the decision hung in the air. Alphonso looked around in the realization that he cannot tear himself away from Mahé and the river to which he belonged. Mahé was within him even in a society, where he had no reason for the sense of belonging. In a way, the film reveals what is now described as authentic "ethnicity".

Cast
 Raghuvaran as Alphonso
 Srividya as Maggi
 Rajan P. Dev
 Malavika as Elsie
 Thilakan as Kumaran Vaidyar 
 Vineeth as Sasi, Son of Kumaran Vaidyar
 Sudheesh as Sivan, Son of Kumaran Vaidyar
 Appa Haja
 Riza Bava as Micheal
 Anil Murali
 Siddique

Awards
Kerala state film awards 1992
  Kerala State Film Award for Best Film
  Kerala State Film Award for Best Actress: Srividya
  Kerala State Film Award for Best Story: M. Mukundan
  Kerala State Film Award for Best Costume Designer:Danda Pani

Novel

The film is based on an award-winning novel of the same name by M. Mukundan. The novel, published in 1989 by D. C. Books, is considered a sequel to Mukundan's magnum opus Mayyazhipuzhayude Theerangalil. The novel won the Kendra Sahitya Akademi Award and N. V. Prize. It was translated to English under the title God's Mischief by Penguin Books in 2002.

Trivia 
The film featured a poem, Irulin Mahanidrayil, written and rendered by famous poet V. Madhusudanan Nair .

References

External links
 

1990s Malayalam-language films
Films based on Indian novels
Films scored by Mohan Sithara
Films directed by Lenin Rajendran